Rozelle Yard was a goods railway yard in Rozelle, New South Wales, Australia. It was one of two major yards on the Metropolitan Goods line, the other being in Darling Harbour. Since heavy rail traffic ceased, part of the site has been redeveloped into a light rail depot and maintenance facility. The site of the former yard is currently being redeveloped into the Rozelle Interchange.

History
By 1908, goods traffic on the line to Darling Harbour and the neighbouring suburban lines had become excessive, with 592 wagons arriving each day and 512 being dispatched. It was decided to construct the Metropolitan Goods line from Sefton to Darling Harbour via Enfield, Dulwich Hill and Rozelle, with extensions to Botany and the State Abattoirs at Homebush Bay. The initial scheme, approved by the Parliamentary Committee on Public Works, approved the initial line from Dulwich Hill to Darling Harbour. To avoid an opening rail bridge alongside the existing Glebe Island Bridge, a circuitous route was built around Rozelle Bay through Pyrmont. The proposal, which included two tunnels under Pyrmont and Glebe, was approved on 23 November 1914, and the line opened on 23 January 1922. A branch line from the yard served White Bay Power Station. The yard was electrified in September 1967.

In January 1996, the Lilyfield to Central section of the Metropolitan Goods line closed. Much of the alignment was reutilised by the Inner West Light Rail that opened to Wentworth Park in August 1997 and was extended to Lilyfield in August 2000. The yard saw a considerable decline in traffic throughout the 2000s, becoming overgrown and being used only intermittently for storage of disused passenger and freight carriages. Traffic on the line ceased in 2009 and the yard fell out of use.

Redevelopment
A light rail stop serving Lilyfield, located adjacent to the rail yards, opened on 13 August 2000 as the terminus of the Wentworth Park-Lilyfield extension of the Inner West Light Rail.

In February 2010, following the cessation of goods traffic the previous year, the Keneally Government announced a  extension of the light rail from Lilyfield to Dulwich Hill. A stabling facility was built to the west of Lilyfield station. A second platform was added at Lilyfield for services towards Dulwich Hill. The Dulwich Hill extension opened in 2014.

The site of the yard is within the area covered by the Bays Precinct project. Rozelle rail yards will be one of ten sub-precincts within Bays West. Ten hectares of parkland are to be built on the site under draft plans.

A maintenance depot was constructed next to the station on the site of the Rozelle Rail Yards. Part of the yard is to be utilised by the WestConnex M4-M5 Link and be redeveloped as the Rozelle Interchange. As a result of the current renewal works, the precinct will include ten hectares of green space featuring smokestacks, sports fields and recreational facilities and is due to be open to the public in late 2023.

Gallery

References

External links

Rail infrastructure in New South Wales
Rozelle, New South Wales
Transport infrastructure completed in 1922
1922 establishments in Australia